The Western Highway is the Victorian part of the principal route linking the Australian cities of Melbourne and Adelaide, with a length of approximately  of single carriageway, then  of dual carriageway known as the Western Freeway. It is a part of the National Highway network and designated routes A8 and M8. The western end continues into South Australia as the Dukes Highway, the next section of the Melbourne–Adelaide National Highway. The Western Freeway joins Melbourne's freeway network via the Western Ring Road, in the western suburbs of Melbourne.

The Western Highway is the second busiest national highway in Australia, in terms of freight movements, with over five million tonnes annually. It provides the link between the eastern seaboard and South Australia and Western Australia. The towns along the way, including Ballarat, Ararat, Stawell and Horsham, are agricultural and manufacturing centres.

Plans are under way for the freeway to be extended west to Ararat, and eventually, to Stawell.

The Western Freeway has subsumed or bypassed numerous sections of the older Western Highway alignment. Bypassed sections of the former Western Highway that remain are generally designated sequentially from C801 to C805, or as Metropolitan Route 8 (within suburban Melbourne).

The Melbourne section of the Western Highway is shown in the 1969 Melbourne Transportation Plan as part of the F12 Freeway corridor.

Route 

The Western Highway begins at the Victorian–South Australian border, east of Bordertown. It is mainly a high quality single carriageway from there to just outside the Melbourne side of Beaufort, with adequate numbers of overtaking lanes. The highway passes through several agricultural centres, for example Horsham, Victoria.

Just west of Buangor, the Western Highway becomes the Western Freeway, adopting freeway standards with two lanes running each way, and begins bypassing most of the towns the old alignment of the highway used to serve.

The newest sections of freeway standard dual carriageway opened on 6 March 2015 for the Ballarat to Beaufort section (running  in length), and on 17 April 2016 for the Beaufort to Buangor section (running  in length).  The first section runs between the end of the Ballarat bypass between a new flyover/interchange with the C805 (Avenue of Remembrance, Burrumbeet) to just outside the eastern side Beaufort (including a bypass of Trawalla) providing  of freeway standard road between Melbourne and Beaufort.  The second section runs between just outside the western side of Beaufort to just after the Buangor bypass, where it becomes a single carriageway again running all the way to Ararat, providing a further  of freeway standard road for between Beaufort and just passed Buangor.

Plans are underway for the end of this freeway to be extended from the current terminus just after the Buangor bypass westward towards and eventually to Stawell.

The dual carriageway continues towards Melbourne bypassing Ballarat, Ballan, Bacchus Marsh, Melton and Rockbank to the Western Ring Road. Major intersecting roads are grade-separated, however there remain minor intersections at-grade. Cycling is permitted on the sealed shoulder along most of the freeway.

History
The passing of the Highways and Vehicles Act of 1924 through the Parliament of Victoria provided for the declaration of State Highways, roads two-thirds financed by the State government through the Country Roads Board (later VicRoads). The Western Highway was declared a State Highway on 1 July 1925., cobbled from a collection of roads from Melbourne through Ballarat, Stawell, Horsham and Dimboola to the state border with South Australia at Serviceton (for a total of 244 miles); before this declaration, the road between Melbourne and Ballarat was referred to as (Main) Ballarat Road or Melbourne-Ballarat Road. The Western Highway was later signed National Route 8 in 1955.

The Whitlam Government introduced the federal National Roads Act 1974, where roads declared as a National Highway were still the responsibility of the states for road construction and maintenance, but were fully compensated by the Federal government for money spent on approved projects. As an important interstate link between the capitals of Victoria and South Australia, the Western Highway was declared a National Highway in 1974.

Upgrades and realignments

Timeline of duplication
 1964/65 - Ballarat East.  of duplicate carriageway completed east of Ballarat. No exact date given. Now part of Route C805 leading from the Western Freeway into Ballarat from the east.
 1966/67 - Deer Park to Rockbank.  of dual carriageways completed during financial year 1966/67. Part of this is now Ballarat Road, Metro Route 8 through Deer Park and Caroline Springs.
 1966/67 - Dual carriageways from Djerriwarrh Creek to Coimadai Creek completed during financial year 1966/67. Now part of Bacchus Marsh Road between Melton and Bacchus Marsh.
 1967/68 - Rockbank to Melton East.
 1969 - Pykes Creek Reservoir. The ‘Western By-pass Road’ is completed, running four miles east and west of Pykes Creek Reservoir.
 1972 - Bacchus Marsh bypass.  opened 30 June 1972, by the Hon. Sir Henry Bolte, GCMG, MP, at a cost of A$4.3m.
 1972 - Gordon section.  opened 5 May 1972, by the Board's chairman, Mr R E V Donaldson, at a cost of A$2.2m.
 1973 - Pentland Hills to Myrniong section.  completed from Korkuperrimul Creek to the Lion Park interchange, early 1973.
 1974 - Pentland Hills section.  ‘west of Bacchus Marsh’ opened 1974.
 1975 - Myrniong bypass opened 3 October 1975, by the Minister for Transport, the Hon. E. R. Meagher, CBE, ED, at a cost of A$3.28m. The  bypass of Myrniong completed '80 km of dual carriageways between Melbourne and Ballarat'.
 1978 - Ballan bypass.  opened 15 June 1978, by the Hon. J. A. Rafferty, Minister for Transport, at a cost of A$9.8m.
 1983 – Wallace and Bungaree bypass opened 9 March 1983, by the Premier of Victoria, the Hon. John Cain MP. The  bypass cost A$23.6m.
 1987 – Melton bypass. The 'freeway work' was opened to traffic on 7 July 1987, with the remainder of works expected to be completed by April 1988. The  bypass cost A$44.2m.
 1989 – 5.6 km bypass of Dimboola opened in May.
 1993 - Ballarat bypass. The first stage, a single carriageway section from Woodmans Hill to the Midland Highway, is opened in December 1993, at a cost of A$62m.
 1994 - Ballarat bypass. The second stage of the initial  single carriageway by-pass is opened to traffic in December 1994.
 1995 - Ballarat bypass. Second carriageway opened to traffic between Woodmans Hill and Gillies Street in December 1995, at a cost of A$25m.
 1998 - Ballarat bypass. The final section opened in February 1998, The final stage featured the duplication of the original single carriageway bypass from Gillies Street to the Sunraysia Highway.
 2001 - The new elevated Hopkins Road Interchange was opened to traffic on 12 July 2001, at a cost of $13.1 million. Before the construction of the new interchange, the intersection of Hopkins Road (Melton-Werribee Road) with the Western Freeway at Rockbank was improved using Black Spot Program funds in 1989 and 1991, but a long-term solution to the congestion and crashes at this location was the construction of an elevated interchange.
 2009 – Deer Park bypass opened to traffic on 5 April 2009, at a cost of A$331m, jointly funded by the state and federal governments. In conjunction with these works, the new Leakes Road interchange at Rockbank was opened in August 2008. This provided a freeway interchange onto the Western Ring Road.
 2011 – Anthony's Cutting realignment. A new  realignment constructed to the south of the previous section of highway, bypassing the steep grades and tight curves of the old alignment between Melton and Bacchus Marsh. The A$200m project was ‘mostly’ open to traffic in June 2011.
 2013 - Ballarat to Burrumbeet.  duplication opened to traffic 31 January 2013.
 2015 - Burrumbeet to Beaufort opened to traffic on 18 February 2015 adding a further  of dual carriageway and includes a bypass of Trawalla however the highway still passes through both Burrumbeet (as dual carriageway) and Beaufort (as single carriageway).
2016 - Beaufort to Buangor opened to traffic in April 2016 adding a further  of dual carriageway to the existing freeway, which includes the Buangor bypass.

Deer Park Bypass

The Deer Park Bypass opened on 5 April 2009 in the western suburbs of Melbourne. The freeway links the Western Freeway at Ravenhall, and the Western Ring Road in Derrimut. This 9.3 kilometre freeway was estimated to cost  which also includes a grade separated interchange or a "full diamond" at Leakes Road in Rockbank.

The purpose of the freeway bypass is to move traffic off Ballarat Road, which leads to the Western Ring Road. Due to the strong population growth of about 8.7 per cent and subdivision in Deer Park and Sunshine, the surrounding suburbs and the seven traffic signals between the Western Ring Road and the start of the Western Freeway, substantial long and very frustrating delays were created for the 70,000 vehicles per day with 10 per cent of this consisting of heavy vehicles.

The bypass had been proposed since the completion of the Western Ring Road, the project stalled due to funding quarrels between the Federal and State Governments. In 2004, the Federal government announced that the Deer Park Bypass would be built as part of a $1.4 billion project "package grant" to Victoria. It was anticipated that more than 15 min of travel time would be saved when travelling through Deer Park, via Ballarat Road.

Construction started on the Deer Park bypass in August 2006, work being carried out as a joint venture by Leighton Contractors and VicRoads, in construction with two contracts. The first stage, allowing westbound traffic over the new bridge at the Ravenhall end of the new freeway, opened in December 2007.

It was announced on 4 March 2009 that the Deer Park Bypass would open in early April 2009, with the new freeway link on track to open more than eight months ahead of schedule.

On that day, Roads and Ports Minister Tim Pallas and Federal Member for Gorton Brendan O'Connor MP inspected works from the new bridge over the Ring Road at Sunshine West and Tim Pallas announced that the $331 million Deer Park Bypass would open to the public on Sunday 5 April 2009.

Anthony's Cutting Realignment

The section of road through Anthony's Cutting between Bacchus Marsh and Melton was one of the most dangerous sections of the route, and was not of modern freeway standard. The steep hills and tight curves along the 5 kilometre long stretch of road resulted in 21 serious crashes in the five years to 2010. More than 29,000 vehicles, including more than 4000 freight vehicles, travel the highway section daily. The new route opened to traffic on 27 June 2011, nine months ahead of schedule.

The project included:
 Extension of Woolpack Road north from Bacchus Marsh Road to a new interchange on the Western Freeway, including a bridge over the Lerderderg River.
 An overpass carrying Bulmans Road over the existing Western Freeway.
 An overpass taking Hopetoun Park Road across the new freeway, with Melbourne-bound on and off ramps.
 Freeway bridges spanning Djerriwarrh Creek, and Cowans Road / Pyrites Creek.

The original project scope included a diamond interchange at Bulmans Road that has not been built, while the ramps at Hopetoun Park Road were not included but was later added. The extension of Woolpack Road has been delayed due to controversy over need to clear trees in the heritage listed Avenue of Honour at Bacchus Marsh.

Realignment of the road through this section had been proposed far back as 2001, when a group of 10 local councils said the realignment could cost just $65 million to build. By 2006 the cost was estimated to be $85 million, with federal Roads Minister Jim Lloyd stating that the project would receive serious consideration for funding in the 2009 AusLink document, subject to support from the State Government. Construction commenced in February 2010, funded by $160 million from the Australian Government and $40 million from the Victorian Government.

Armstrong deviation
In 2001 work started on a 4.2 kilometre long deviation at Armstrong (on the Adelaide side of Ararat), involving 200,000 cubic metres of earthworks and a new bridge over the main Melbourne–Adelaide railway. Previously high vehicles could not travel under the rail overpass and were forced to detour around it, in addition the poor road conditions led to a number of accidents and fatalities. Costing $6.1 million the work was completed by 2003.

Future upgrades 
, several at-grade intersections remained on the "freeway", particularly in the areas near Rockbank and at Woodmans Hill just to the east of Ballarat.
 Proposed upgrade and safety improvements Rockbank to Melton, to be funded by Auslink 2 (2009–2014).
 Proposed extension west from the current freeway terminus in the Melbourne side of Beaufort West through to Ararat and eventually to Stawell, also part of Auslink 2. Beaufort to Buangor was completed in April 2016. Buangor Bypass completed in mid-2016, and Buangor to Ararat was expected to start in early 2017.

Duplication of the Western Highway between Ballarat and Stawell was proposed to be completed between 2009 and 2014, to be funded by Auslink 2. At the end of 2016, some parts were still in early planning, including the bypasses at Beaufort and Ararat.

The clearing of wide swathes of the ancient red gums by Vic Roads near Beaufort resulted in expressions of community concern, including public meetings. Isabel Mackenzie, a long-term resident of the area, said she was concerned at the environmental impact of removing trees that are hundreds of years old. Helen Lewers said that VicRoads should reroute the highway between Buangor and Stawell to preserve the native roadside vegetation.

Towns and suburbs 

Towns and suburbs along the Western Highway are listed in the following table.

Exits and major intersections

See also

 Ballarat Road
 Dukes Highway
 Freeways in Australia
 Freeways in Victoria
 Road transport in Victoria

External links 
Timelapse footage of the Western Freeway between Melbourne and Ballarat

References

Highways and freeways in Melbourne
Highways in Victoria (Australia)
Shire of Moorabool
Transport in the City of Melton
Transport in the City of Brimbank
City of Ballarat
Rural City of Ararat
Rural City of Horsham
Shire of Pyrenees
Shire of Northern Grampians
Shire of Hindmarsh
Shire of West Wimmera
Grampians (region)